"Paraffin" is the first single by the trip hop/industrial band Ruby, from their debut album Salt Peter. It was released in the United Kingdom on September 4, 1995, and in the United States on November 7, 1995, by the WORK/Creation record labels. The single would chart in the United Kingdom but not in the U.S.

CD single
The inside of the single jacket contains the following words:
"A craving for singularity... I can speak so softly because I hold so much power LISTEN FEEL SMELL There's so much more power in subtlety"
The phrase "I can speak so softly because I hold so much power" is the last lyric from the song "Heidi" on Ruby's first album Salt Peter. It also has three small pictures around the words, two of which would be the cover art for the follow-up singles "Tiny Meat" and "Hoops."

Track listing

 "Paraffin" (Red Snapper mix) (4:25) -Rankine, Walk  
 "Paraffin" (single mix) (3:35) -Rankine, Walk 
 "Paraffin" (Richard Fearless Dub) (8:05) -Rankine, Walk
 "Paraffin" (Harpie mix) (3:53) -Rankine, Walk 
 "Heidi"  (album version) (4:04) -Rankine, Walk
total length: (24:08)

Production and personnel
The CD single was produced and written by Mark Walk & Lesley Rankine. It was mixed and engineered by Walk, with Scott Crane as assistant engineer. The object photos in it were by Matthew Donaldson and artwork & the other photos by Rankine, except the one of Rankine which was by Joseph Cultice.

Chart performance

Singles

Music video
As with all of Ruby's singles, this song had a promotional video made for it.

References

External links
 Official artist website (archived)

1995 debut singles
Ruby (band) songs